Hells Angels on Wheels is a 1967 American biker film directed by Richard Rush, and starring Adam Roarke, Jack Nicholson, and Sabrina Scharf. The film tells the story of a gas-station attendant with a bad attitude who finds life more exciting after he is allowed to hang out with a chapter of the Hells Angels outlaw motorcycle club.

Plot
The Angels first take note of "Poet" (Jack Nicholson) after one of them inadvertently damages his motorcycle and breaks its headlight. Poet, with far more guts than brains, challenges the Angel that hit his motorcycle. This is an act that would traditionally result in every Angel present participating in a group beating of the attacker. "When a non-Angel hits an Angel, all Angels retaliate." But the leader of the Angels, Buddy (Adam Roarke), intervenes and tells Poet that the Angels will replace the headlight. In the meantime, he's welcome to ride with them while they take care of business—which turns out to be going to a bar and beating up the members of another club who previously beat an Angel.

Poet is told to wait outside, but ends up helping the Angels. Later that night, the Angels return the favor by hunting down and beating four sailors who beat Poet four-against-one after he parted company with the group. Poet accidentally bumps into one of the sailors and speaks rudely to him before he realizes that the sailor has three other sailors with him. The four sailors then refuse to accept his apology—but the Angels only know that four sailors beat up Poet, and he doesn't tell them how the earlier fight started. One of the sailors pulls a knife on the Angels and is then killed accidentally in the fight that follows.

Poet is allowed to ride with the Angels and is eventually elevated to "prospect" status. He is attracted to Buddy's some-time girlfriend (Sabrina Scharf) who toys with him while remaining hopelessly committed to Buddy.

Much of the story that follows consists of scenes of the Angels partying or being provoked to violence by "squares." Other scenes include running an older man in a car off the road to his death; forcing two cops off the road when freeing their friend, arrested for the death; or entering a bar where they are not welcome.

Eventually, Buddy's girlfriend succeeds in provoking a confrontation between Buddy and Poet, with only one of the men surviving.

Cast
Adam Roarke as Buddy
Jack Nicholson as Poet
Sabrina Scharf as Shill
Jana Taylor as Abigale
Richard Anders	as Bull
John Garwood as Jocko
I.J. Jefferson as Pearl
James Oliver as Darrell 'Gypsy' Whitman
Jack Starrett as Sgt. Bingham
Bruno VeSota as Priest
Sonny Barger as Hells Angels President
Robert Allen as Dr. Carstairs
Virgil Frye as Biker

Production
Adam Roarke, who plays the Angels club president Buddy, starred in several other motorcycle films of the era. Ralph 'Sonny' Barger, the president of the Oakland, California chapter of the Hells Angels, is seen in an early scene but has no spoken lines in the film. He was also credited as a consultant. Sabrina Scharf later played the role of Sara in the film Easy Rider (1969), one of the two girls met in the commune.

Release
Hells Angels on Wheels was released in theatres on December 1, 1967. The film was released on DVD on December 30, 2003.

See also
 List of American films of 1967
 Outlaw biker film
 List of biker films
 Exploitation film

References

External links
 
 
 Hells Angels on Wheels at Biker Cinema
 

1967 films
1960s crime action films
American crime action films
American road movies
Films directed by Richard Rush
Outlaw biker films
1967 crime drama films
American crime drama films
Films with screenplays by Robert Wright Campbell
Hells Angels
Films scored by Stu Phillips
American exploitation films
1960s English-language films
1960s American films